The women's 64 kilograms competition at the 2022 World Weightlifting Championships was held on 10 December 2022.

Schedule

Medalists

Records

Results

References

Women's 64 kg
World Championships